The Clyde was an electoral district of the Legislative Assembly in the Australian state of New South Wales which was creating in 1904, named after the Clyde River and replacing Moruya. It was abolished in 1913 and replaced by Bega.

Members for The Clyde

Election results

1910

1907

1904

References

Clyde
Constituencies established in 1904
Constituencies disestablished in 1913
1904 establishments in Australia
1913 disestablishments in Australia